Jhonny Cubero Quesada (born 23 March 1976 in Grecia) is a Costa Rican professional footballer who currently plays for Coatepeque in Guatemala.

Club career
A much-travelled forward, Cubero made his professional debut on 23 March 1996 for Puntarenas against Municipal Goicochea and spent the first seasons of his career at Costa Rican sides Puntarenas, Alajuelense and San Carlos for whom he scored 19 in the 2002 season before moving abroad to play in Guatemala for over 10 years. He won the 2007 Clausura title with Xelajú.

In June 2010 Cubero returned to his native Costa Rica but in September 2010 he was released by Santos de Guápiles for alleged indiscipline. He then returned to Guatemala and was snapped up by Suchitepéquez.

In August 2012 he signed for Guatemalan second division side Deportivo Ayutla, he joined Juventud Escuintleca for the 2013 Clausura and moved to Coatepeque in September 2013.

International career
Cubero has made five appearances for the Costa Rica national football team, his debut coming in a friendly against Ecuador on February 16, 2005.  He made two substitute appearances at the UNCAF Nations Cup 2005 and two substitute appearances at the 2007 CONCACAF Gold Cup.

Personal life
Cubero is a son of former Costa Rican international José Pepe Cubero. He has become a Guatemalan citizen.

References

External links
 
 La ilusión de Cubero (2001 Bio) - Nación 

1976 births
Living people
People from Grecia (canton)
Costa Rican footballers
Costa Rica international footballers
Association football forwards
Naturalized citizens of Guatemala
Costa Rican emigrants to Guatemala
2005 UNCAF Nations Cup players
2007 CONCACAF Gold Cup players
Puntarenas F.C. players
L.D. Alajuelense footballers
A.D. San Carlos footballers
Comunicaciones F.C. players
Xelajú MC players
C.D. Suchitepéquez players
Santos de Guápiles footballers
Costa Rican expatriate footballers
Expatriate footballers in Guatemala
Liga FPD players
Copa Centroamericana-winning players
Deportivo Ayutla players